Boscë (Serbian Cyrillic: Босце) is a village in Kamenica municipality, Kosovo. It is located in the Gollak mountains.

Demographics 
As of 2011 the village has 86 inhabitants, 72 of which are Serbs and 14 are Roma.

References 

Villages in Kamenica, Kosovo